The 2018 Novak Djokovic tennis season started with the Tie Break Tens event in Melbourne, Australia.

Yearly summary

Early Hard Court Season

Tie Break Tens
Djokovic returned from his six month injury hiatus since 2017 Wimbledon Championships at the Tie Break Tens event where he played a tune-up for the 2018 Australian Open. He was defeated by Lleyton Hewitt in his first match, 10–6.

Australian Open
Djokovic played his first official match since Wimbledon at the Australian Open. After defeating Donald Young in straight sets, he defeated Gaël Monfils in the second round after dropping the first set, with Monfils succumbing to extreme heat in the latter stages of the match. With a victory over Albert Ramos Viñolas in third round, Djokovic set up a meeting with Korean Chung Hyeon. In a match of constant breaks of serve, Djokovic eventually lost in straight sets due to relentless backcourt defense from Chung and copious unforced errors on critical points. After his loss, Djokovic decided to undergo a surgery on his right elbow, which he claimed was affecting him from previous two years.

Indian Wells Masters
Djokovic surprisingly returned to tour since his surgery at the Indian Wells Masters. After receiving a first round bye, he was upset in the second round by World No. 109 Taro Daniel in three sets.

Miami Open
Djokovic's next event was at the Miami Open, where his spring slump continued as he lost to Benoît Paire in straight sets.

Clay Court Season

Monte Carlo Masters
Hoping to regain form at the clay court events, Djokovic played at the Monte Carlo Masters. He won his first two matches in straight sets, defeating Dušan Lajović and Borna Ćorić in first and second rounds respectively. His 6–0, 6–1 win over Lajović was particularly dominant and suggested significant improvements in form. He needed 10 match points to beat Coric in round 2. In the third round, he lost to World No. 7 and clay court specialist Dominic Thiem. After the match, Djokovic stated : "After two years finally I can play without pain".

Barcelona Open
Inspired by his improvement, Djokovic took a wildcard to play at Barcelona Open He was unable to carry on his run there, and lost to Martin Klizan in his opening round match.

Madrid Open
Djokovic next competed at the Madrid Open. In his first victory over a top-20 opponent in over eight months, he defeated former World No. 5 Kei Nishikori in the first round, before falling to Briton Kyle Edmund. As a result of the loss and failing to defend his semifinals position at the event, Djokovic fell to No. 18, his lowest ranking in twelve years.

Italian Open
Djokovic's next event was the Italian Open, where he has previously won four times and was the defending finalist. He progressed to his first quarterfinals appearance since 2017 Wimbledon, defeating Alexandr Dolgopolov, Nikoloz Basilashvili and Albert Ramos in straight sets. He would go on to beat Kei Nishikori, but lose to eventual champion Rafael Nadal in the semifinal.  After failing to defend his finalist points from 2017, Djokovic's ranking fell to No. 22.  This was his first time out of the top 20 since October 2006.

French Open
In Roland Garros, Djokovic beat Roberto Bautista Agut and Fernando Verdasco en route to the quarterfinals, where he suffered a shocking defeat to Marco Cecchinato in four sets.

Grass Court Season

Queen's Club
Djokovic took a wildcard to play at Queen's Club for the first time since 2010. He beat second seed Grigor Dimitrov, Adrian Mannarino, and Jérémy Chardy to reach the final. In the final, he lost to Marin Čilić in three sets, despite holding a match point.

Wimbledon
Showing further improvement in form, Djokovic beat Australian Open quarter-finalist Tennys Sandgren, British number one Kyle Edmund, and Kei Nishikori to set up a semifinal against Rafael Nadal. In the second longest Wimbledon semifinal to date (second only to the first semifinal between Isner and Anderson), Djokovic beat Nadal in five sets played over two days due to Wimbledons 11pm curfew and the first semifinal delaying the start of the Djokovic Nadal semifinal to after 8PM local time.

He then defeated Kevin Anderson in the final in straight sets to win his fourth Wimbledon title and 13th overall Grand Slam title. This was his first title of the season, which catapulted him from 21st back into the 10th spot in the rankings. He also became the lowest ranked male player to win a Wimbledon title since Goran Ivanišević won it in 2001 as a wildcard.

US Open Series

Canadian Open
Djokovic started his US Open series campaign with straightforward wins against Mirza Bašić and Peter Polansky in Toronto, but fell in the third round to Stefanos Tsitsipas.

Cincinnati Masters
Next for Djokovic was the Cincinnati Masters, the only Masters 1000 tournament he hadn't won. After beating Steve Johnson in straight sets, Djokovic faced several difficult matches in a row. He had to come back from a one-set deficit against Adrian Mannarino and ATP number 5 Grigor Dimitrov, and needed three sets to beat Milos Raonic in the quarterfinals and Marin Čilić in the semifinals.

Djokovic then beat top-seeded and number 2 ranked Roger Federer in straight sets in the final. It was their first match since their semifinal match at the 2016 Australian Open. With this win, Djokovic became the first singles player to complete the Career Golden Masters.

US Open

Struggling with the heat and humidity, Djokovic survived an upset scare and beat Márton Fucsovics in four sets in the first round. He would again need four sets to overcome Tennys Sandgren in the second round. With cooler conditions, the next rounds proved to be easier: Richard Gasquet in the third round, João Sousa, and John Millman in the quarterfinal were all defeated in straight sets. 

He would then face Kei Nishikori in their first match at the US Open since Nishikori's upset over Djokovic in 2014. This time Djokovic prevailed in straight sets to set up a final against Juan Martín del Potro. In the final, Djokovic took control of the match early, winning the first set and securing a break early in the second. However, a spirited comeback from del Potro prolonged the second set, with Djokovic winning in a tiebreaker after a 95 minute set. Djokovic eventually closed out the match in straight sets.

The victory earned Djokovic his third US Open and 14th Grand Slam title overall, tying Pete Sampras. He also climbed back to number 3 in the ATP rankings and qualified for the ATP Finals.

Fall hard court season

Shanghai Masters
Seeded second at the Shanghai Masters, he defeated Jérémy Chardy, 16th seed Marco Cecchinato, 7th seed Kevin Anderson, 4th seed Alexander Zverev, and 13th seed Borna Ćorić in a decisive run. He did not drop a set nor have his serve broken during the tournament. This was his fourth title in Shanghai and second Masters title of the year. With this win, he overtook Roger Federer and returned to the #2 ranking for the first time since the 2017 French Open.

Paris Masters
Djokovic defeated João Sousa, Damir Džumhur, Marin Čilić, and his rival Roger Federer en route to the final, where he lost in straight sets to Karen Khachanov.

However, with Rafael Nadal's withdrawal from the tournament, Djokovic regained the No. 1 ranking after the tournament concluded. It was exactly two years ago when he lost the No. 1 ranking in Paris, following a quarterfinals exit.

ATP Finals
Djokovic easily qualified for the semifinals, winning all 3 of his round robin matches in straight sets and without losing serve.  He defeated John Isner, Sascha Zverev and Marin Cilic.  In the semifinals he defeated Wimbledon runner up Kevin Anderson in straight sets.  In the final he faced Sascha Zverev, who Djokovic beat four days earlier in round robin play.  This time Zverev came out on top in straight sets for his first ATP Finals title.

All matches

This table lists all the matches of Djokovic this year, including walkovers W/O (they are marked ND for non-decision)

Singles matches

Doubles matches

Exhibition matches

Singles schedule

Yearly records

Head-to-head matchups
	 
Novak Djokovic has a  ATP match win–loss record in the 2018 season. Bold indicates player was ranked top 10 at the time of at least one meeting. The following list is ordered by number of wins:

  Kei Nishikori 4–0
  Kevin Anderson 3–1
  Marin Čilić 3–1
  Roger Federer 2–0
  Grigor Dimitrov 2–0
  Albert Ramos Viñolas 2–0
  Adrian Mannarino 2–0
  Tennys Sandgren 2–0
  John Millman 2–0
  Jérémy Chardy 2–0
  Borna Ćorić 2–0
  João Sousa 2–0
  Alexander Zverev 2–1
  Rafael Nadal 1–1
  Kyle Edmund 1–1
  Karen Khachanov 1–1
  Marco Cecchinato 1–1
  Juan Martín del Potro 1–0
  John Isner 1–0
  Donald Young 1–0
  Gaël Monfils 1–0
  Dušan Lajović 1–0
  Alexandr Dolgopolov 1–0
  Nikoloz Basilashvili 1–0
  Rogério Dutra Silva 1–0
  Jaume Munar 1–0
  Roberto Bautista Agut 1–0
  Fernando Verdasco 1–0
  Horacio Zeballos 1–0
  Mirza Bašić 1–0
  Peter Polansky 1–0
  Steve Johnson 1–0
  Milos Raonic 1–0
  Márton Fucsovics 1–0
  Richard Gasquet 1–0
  Damir Džumhur 1–0
  Dominic Thiem 0–1
  Chung Hyeon 0–1
  Taro Daniel 0–1
  Benoît Paire 0–1
  Martin Kližan 0–1
  Stefanos Tsitsipas 0–1

* Statistics correct .

Finals

Singles: 7 (4 titles, 3 runner-ups)

Earnings
Bold font denotes tournament win

 Figures in United States dollars (USD) unless noted. 
source：

See also

 2018 ATP World Tour
 2018 Roger Federer tennis season
 2018 Rafael Nadal tennis season
 2018 Juan Martín del Potro tennis season

References

External links
  
 ATP tour profile

Novak Djokovic tennis seasons
Djokovic
2018 in Serbian sport